Rahel Jaeggi (born July 19, 1967) is a professor of practical philosophy and social philosophy at the Humboldt University of Berlin. Her research areas are in social philosophy, political philosophy, ethics, philosophical anthropology, social ontology, and critical theory. Since February 2018 she has been the head of the Berlin campus of the newly founded International Center for Humanities and Social Change.

Biography 
Rahel Jaeggi is the daughter of Swiss sociologist Urs Jaeggi and Austrian psychoanalyst and author Eva Jaeggi. Prior to working as a research assistant to Prof. Dr. Axel Honneth  (1996-2001) at the Philosophical Institute of the University of Frankfurt (Chair of Social Philosophy) and at the  Institute for Social Research, Jaeggi studied at the Free University of Berlin (1990 - 1996). She completed her studies with a thesis  (Magistra Artium) on the political philosophy of Hannah Arendt. In 1999 she was a visiting scholar at the New School for Social Research, New York. She wrote her doctoral thesis on the concept of alienation (Freiheit und Indifferenz – Versuch einer Rekonstruktion des Entfremdungsbegriffs, 2002). Research and teaching positions brought her to Yale University in New Haven, the New School for Social Research in New York City, and the University of Frankfurt.

She wrote her habilitation thesis  on the theme  Critique of Forms of Life at the University of Frankfurt.
Since 2009 she has been the chair of practical philosophy and social philosophy at the Humboldt University of Berlin.

During the academic year of 2015–2016, Jaeggi was Theodor Heuss Visiting Professor in Philosophy at The New School for Social Research in New York .  In 2017 and 2018 she co-organized (with The New School's Alice Crary) the  Kritische Theorie in Berlin Summer School (Progress, Regression, and Social Change) in Berlin, Germany.

Together with Daniel Loick, Jaeggi was the main organizer of the international conference "Re-thinking Marx", which took place  from 20 to 22 May 2011 at the Humboldt-University of Berlin. During the conference 50 well-known scholars, including the philosopher Étienne Balibar, the sociologist Saskia Sassen, the political scientist Wendy Brown and the social philosopher Axel Honneth  discussed topics such as freedom, justice, exploitation and alienation.

Jaeggi receives funding from the Humanities & Social Change International Foundation  (established by the businessman and politician of SPD  Erck Rickmers) to conduct a research project on the Crisis of Capitalism and Democracy.

In May 2018, together with Sabine Hark, Kristina Lepold  and Thomas Seibert, she hosted the international conference Emancipation, which took place at the Technical University Berlin.

Selected works in English

Books 
 Alienation. New York: Columbia University Press, 2014.
 Capitalism: A Conversation in Critical Theory (with Nancy Fraser). Cambridge, UK: Polity Press, 2018.
 Critique of Forms of Life. Cambridge, MA: Harvard University Press, 2018.

About Rahel Jaeggi:
 From Alienation to Forms of Life - The Critical Theory of Rahel Jaeggi (edited by Amy Allen and Eduardo Mendieta). Penn State Series in Critical Theory. The Pennsylvania State University Press, 2018.

Essays 
 "What (if Anything) Is Wrong with Capitalism". Working Paper 01/2013 of the DFG–Forschungskolleg Postwachstumsgesellschaften, Friedrich-Schiller University, Jena, 2013.
 "What is a (good) Institution?" in: Social Philosophy and Critique, Rainer Forst, Martin Hartmann, Rahel Jaeggi and Martin Saar (ed.), 2009.
 "Re-Thinking Ideology" in: New Waves in Political Philosophy, Christopher Zurn, Boujdewijn de Bruijn (ed.), 2008.
 "No Individual Can Do Anything Against It: Adorno's Minima Moralia as a Critique of Forms of Life" in: Dialectic of Freedom, Axel Honneth (ed.), Suhrkamp, 2005.
 "Solidarity and Indifference" in: Solidarity and Care in the European Union, R. Termeulen and R. Houtepen (ed.), Kluwer, 2001.
 "The Market's Price" in: Constellations, volume 8, nº 3, 2001.

References

External links 
 Official website of the Humboldt-University of Berlin
 Website of Critical Theory in Berlin, events of the Practical Philosophy and Social Philosophy chair of the Humboldt University of Berlin.

21st-century Swiss philosophers
1967 births
Continental philosophers
Frankfurt School
Critical theorists
Free University of Berlin alumni
Academic staff of Goethe University Frankfurt
Academic staff of the Humboldt University of Berlin
Living people
People from Bern
Political philosophers
Social philosophers
Swiss ethicists
Swiss political philosophers
Swiss writers in German
The New School faculty
Swiss women philosophers